The Vače Situla (also ) is an ornamented Early Iron Age ritual bronze vessel (situla) found in the second half of the 19th century at the Hallstatt Archaeological Site in Vače in central Slovenia. It counts among the highest-quality such vessels in general and among the most precious archeological artifacts of the country. Dating from the 5th century BC, it is considered to be one of the oldest situla objects of the northern Illyrians found in the Eastern Hallstatt zone. The vessel has three rows of relief that show the ordinary life of the ruling class and also reflect the religious understanding of the world in that time. It is on display in the National Museum of Slovenia.

Discovery
It was discovered by the farmer Janez Grilc in the beginning of 1882 (by oral tradition on 17 January, but most probably in March that year). In the same year, after the director of the Provincial Museum of Carniola, Karel Dežman, was informed about the find, it was purchased by a museum agent for 18 florins and 20 kreutzers. Later, the museum estimated its value at about 6,000 florins.

Artifact

The holder is made of thick torqued wire and has the ends in the form of stylized duck's head. It was made in toreutic technique and may have been used as a ritual vessel for holding holy water.

Friezes

The situla is decorated with three horizontally parallel rows of bas relief, showing warriors, ritual combat, and animals using small figures. The upper one shows a solemn procession of warriors on foot, on horses, and on two chariots. The middle one shows the main happening: at first a sacrifice of grain, followed by a celebration, with four worthies sitting on their thrones and each one receiving gifts from other men. This is followed by a scene showing ritual wrestling for a trophy (a pot helmet with a long crest). The bottom one shows eight animals in a row: the first one is a lion with a wolf's tail, devouring an animal leg, followed by three does and four ibexes. The upper two rows form a continuum, similar to an epic. The vessel's reliefs show influences of the Etruscan art.

Legacy
The small figures taken from this situla are used as background graphics in the Slovenian passport and are shown enlarged five times on a bronze replica standing at the beginning of the local Vače archaeological trail, tours of which are led by a family theater group from Vače. Other important monuments along the archaeological trail are the Iron Age cemeteries in the Ronkar Ravines and at the Reber, Nad Lazom, and Drage sites, with a former terrace settlement at the Spodnja Krona and Zgornja Krona sites.

Gallery

See also
 Vače Belt-Plate
 Este culture

References

External links

Illyrian art
Archaeological discoveries in Slovenia
Iron Age of Slovenia
Bronzeware
5th-century BC works
1882 in science
1882 archaeological discoveries